Pavel Semenovich Sorokin (1836/39 - 1886) was a Russian painter of religious themes.  He was a member of the Imperial Academy of Arts in Saint Petersburg and died in Moscow.

Sorokin was the brother of artists Evgraf and Vasili Sorokin.

References
John Milner. A Dictionary of Russian and Soviet Artists, 1420 - 1970. Woodbridge, Suffolk; Antique Collectors' Club, 1993

1830s births
1886 deaths
19th-century painters from the Russian Empire
Russian male painters
19th-century male artists from the Russian Empire